Lokenge Mungongo (born 8 October 1978) is a Congolese footballer. He played in seven matches for the DR Congo national football team from 1997 to 1999. He was also named in the DR Congo's squad for the 1998 African Cup of Nations tournament.

References

External links
 

1978 births
Living people
Democratic Republic of the Congo footballers
Democratic Republic of the Congo international footballers
1998 African Cup of Nations players
Place of birth missing (living people)
Association footballers not categorized by position
21st-century Democratic Republic of the Congo people